Androna, also known as al-Andarin, is a Byzantine site spread over a vast area at the edges of the semi-desert, about 25 kilometers beyond the more well-known Byzantine site of Qasr Ibn Wardan.

History

Androna was built as a defense line against nomadic skirmishes in the Syrian Desert. The fortified city contains many churches, palaces and baths; and was famous for its vineyards and high-quality wine in which it was mentioned by Amr ibn Kulthum in his ode.  

The following is the opening verse of his ode:

References

Archaeological sites in Aleppo Governorate
Former populated places in Syria